Revere is an unincorporated community in Nockamixon Township in Bucks County, Pennsylvania, United States. Revere is located at the intersection of Pennsylvania Route 611 and Marienstein Road. Residents of Revere are part of the Palisades School District.

References

Unincorporated communities in Bucks County, Pennsylvania
Unincorporated communities in Pennsylvania